Haenchen is a surname, likely of German origin. Notable people with the surname include:

Ernst Haenchen (1894-1975), German Protestant theologian, professor, and Biblical scholar
Hartmut Haenchen (born 1943), German conductor